The 2019 Pau Grand Prix was a Formula Three motor race held on 19 May 2019 at the Pau circuit, in Pau, Pyrénées-Atlantiques, France. The Grand Prix was run as the second round of the 2019 Euroformula Open Championship. The Grand Prix was won by Billy Monger.

Entry List 
All teams utilize the Dallara F317 chassis.

Results

Qualifying (Race 1)

Race 1 
Liam Lawson produced a dominant effort in winning the first race of the weekend, with Team Motopark team-mates Julian Hanses and Marino Sato finishing second and third respectively. Several drivers started the race on wet tyres, gambling on a potential downpour later on in the race. The weather would remain dry and those who gambled on the wet tyres would begin to tumble down the field. Kjærgaard, Tsunoda and Hahn all fell victim to the narrow nature of the circuit, retiring due to accident damage.

Qualifying (Grand Prix)

Race 2 (Grand Prix)

References

Pau Grand Prix
Pau Grand Prix
Pau Grand Prix